Strength of Steel is the fourth studio album by Canadian heavy metal band Anvil. It was released by Metal Blade and Enigma Records on May 21, 1987.

It is the group's sole charting album in the United States, peaking at No. 191 on the Billboard 200 album chart in 1987. It was also the band's first release on Metal Blade Records. Two of the songs on this album ("Straight Between the Eyes" and "Wild Eyes") appeared in the film Sleepaway Camp II: Unhappy Campers.

A music video was made for the song "Mad Dog".

Track listing
All tracks by Anvil, except "Wild Eyes" by Rich Dodson

Personnel
Anvil
Steve "Lips" Kudlow – vocals, guitar
Dave Allison – guitar, second vocal on "Straight Between the Eyes"
Ian Dickson – bass
Robb Reiner – drums

Production
Paul Lachapelle – producer, engineer, mixing
Gabor Varszegi – executive producer

References

Anvil (band) albums
1987 albums
Metal Blade Records albums
Roadrunner Records albums
Enigma Records albums